The  Party for Unity and Rally (PUR) is an Islamist political party in Senegal. The party was founded in 1998 and is led by Cheikh Mouhamadou Moustapha Sy. The party won three seats at the 2017 parliamentary election. In September 2021 it joined Ousmane Sonko's Liberate the People alliance. During the following year the coalition contested first the 2022 local elections, winning in several major cities including Dakar, and later the 2022 national election, gaining 56 seats and becoming the second biggest coalition in the National Assembly. Its colours are green and white; its symbol is two doves facing each other.

Electoral results

Presidential elections

National Assembly elections

References

Ed Van Hoven, « The Nation Turbaned? The Construction of Nationalist Muslim Identities in Senegal », Journal of Religion in Africa, vol. 30, fasc. 2, May 2000, p. 225-248

Political parties in Senegal
Political parties established in 1998
1998 establishments in Senegal
Islamic democratic political parties
Conservative parties in Africa